The 1679 Sanhe-Pinggu earthquake was a major quake that struck the Zhili (Greater Beijing) region in Qing China on the morning of September 2, 1679. It is the largest recorded surface rupture event to have occurred in the North China Plain.

Earthquake
The earthquake struck sometime between 9am and 11am on Saturday, September 2, 1679, and had its epicenter in Sanhe, modern day Hebei Province. It had an estimated magnitude of 8.0  and ruptured along most of the Xiadian Fault's length.

Impact
The 1679 earthquake was most devastating for the towns of Sanhe and Pinggu, east of Beijing.  In these two towns, intensity is estimated to have reached X (extreme) while in Beijing the intensity reached VIII (severe).  Sanhe was virtually destroyed while in Pinggu only between 30 and 40% households survived.  Many buildings and structures in Beijing were also damaged or destroyed.  The Qing dynasty White Pagoda in Beihai Park and Desheng Gate were both destroyed.  The Kangxi Emperor survived the quake, but many officials and citizens in Beijing were killed.  While the total number of fatalities is unknown, it is estimated that upwards of 45,500 were killed by the quake.

The earthquake was felt as far west as Gansu Province and as far northeast as Liaoning Province.

Future threat
While the Xiadian Fault is still active and poses a potential threat to the Greater Beijing region, earthquakes of this magnitude are predicted to occur only every 6,500 years along the slow moving fault.  Other similar faults, however, exist in the Beijing region and are not properly understood.  On average, a major earthquake is predicted to occur in the North China Plain every 300 years, most recently with the 1976 Tangshan earthquake.  A 2007 study by Risk Management Solutions found that an earthquake similar in size to the 1679 Sanhe-Pinggu event could have devastating effects and result in the deaths of between 35,000 and 75,000 people.  In addition, economic impacts at that time were estimated to be 445 billion RMB (c. $57 billion).

References

Earthquakes in China
1679 earthquakes
17th century in Beijing
Disasters in Qing dynasty
History of Hebei
Langfang